"Say a Prayer for the Boys "Out There"" is a World War I era song released in 1917. Bernie Grossman wrote the lyrics. Alex Marr composed the music. It was published by Joe Morris Music, Co. of New York, New York. The sheet music cover was designed by the Starmer Brothers. It features a family praying at the dinner table. Behind them is a sentry guarding a campground of tents. There is an inset photo on the left side that varies per edition. The song was written for both voice and piano.

It was recorded by artists Bob Hall  and the Peerless Quartet.

The sheet music can be found at Pritzker Military Museum & Library.

Lyrics

References

External links
 View the song MP3 and sheet music cover here.

Songs about soldiers
1917 songs
Songs of World War I